The recurvebills are two species of Furnariid birds from the genus Syndactyla. They are restricted to humid forests in the South American countries of Bolivia, Peru and Brazil. Their common name refers to the peculiar bill-shape, which, at least in the case of the larger-billed Peruvian recurvebill, is an adaption for manipulating bamboo stems. Both species are overall rufescent brown. The SACC reclassified the recurvebills from the genus Simoxenops to Syndactyla based on studies from Dewberry (2011).

Species
 Peruvian recurvebill, Syndactyla ucayalae
 Bolivian recurvebill, Syndactyla striatus

References
 Remsen, J. V. 2003. Simoxenops ucayalae & S. striatus (Peruvian & Bolivian Recurvebill). Pp. 331 in: del Hoyo, J., A. Alliott, & D. A. Christie. eds. 2003. Handbook of the Birds of the World. Vol. 8. Broadbills to Tapaculos. Lynx Edicions, Barcelona. 
 DERRYBERRY, E., S. CLARAMUNT, G. DERRYBERRY, R. T. CHESSER, J. CRACRAFT, A. ALEIXO, J. PÉREZ-ÉMAN, J. V. REMSEN, JR., & R. T. BRUMFIELD.  2011.  Lineage diversification and morphological evolution in a large-scale continental radiation: the Neotropical ovenbirds and woodcreepers (Aves: Furnariidae).  Evolution 65: 2973–2986.

 
Taxonomy articles created by Polbot
Bird common names
Taxa named by Ludwig Reichenbach